Bílá is a municipality and village in Liberec District in the Liberec Region of the Czech Republic. It has about 1,000 inhabitants.

Administrative parts
Villages of Bohdánkov, Chvalčovice, Dehtáry, Domaslavice, Hradčany, Klamorna, Kocourov, Kohoutovice, Letařovice, Petrašovice, Trávníček, Vesec and Vlčetín are administrative parts of Bílá.

References

External links

Villages in Liberec District